The Slovenian National Time Trial Championships have been held since 1991.

Multiple champions 
Riders that managed to win the Elite race more than once.

Elite

Men

Women

See also
Slovenian National Road Race Championships
National Road Cycling Championships

References

National road cycling championships
Cycle races in Slovenia
Recurring sporting events established in 1997
1997 establishments in Slovenia
National championships in Slovenia